The  is an archaeological site with the ruins of a Jōmon period settlement located in what is now the Tsukiyono neighborhood of the town of Minakami, Gunma Prefecture in the northern Kantō region of Japan. The site was designated a National Historic Site of Japan in 1997.

Overview
The Yaze site is located at the bottom of a river terrace on the right bank of the Tone River. An archaeological excavation conducted in 1992 revealed the ruins of a complete Jōmon period village, including cemeteries, ritual sites, and water areas. The water field was originally dug into a spring, and lined with river stones to form a pond, with a drainage trench and a row of standing stones. Seeds such as acorns, horse chestnuts and walnuts were excavated from the bottom of the pond, indicating that this was used to leach bitter tannins from the seeds to make them more edible. The ritual site was centered on an altar-shaped stone structure that was close to the water, and there was also the foundations for a huge wooden pillar structure whose supporting pillars had a diameter of 80 centimeters and were made from chestnut wood. The graveyard contained more than 100 stone graves, and there were 22 pit dwellings at the site of the village, divided into north and south areas, centering on this very large structure. The site contained a huge amount of excavated relics, including many items of jewelry and ritual objects. The site was dated to 3,500 to 2,300 years ago.

The area is part of a roadside station, which has a number of faux reconstructions of pit dwellings. The site is located about 10 minutes on foot from Jōmō-Kōgen Station on the JR East  Jōetsu Shinkansen..

See also
List of Historic Sites of Japan (Gunma)

References

External links
Minakami official site 

Jōmon period]
History of Gunma Prefecture
Minakami, Gunma
Archaeological sites in Japan
Historic Sites of Japan